Anotylus is a genus of spiny-legged rove beetles in the family Staphylinidae. There are more than 90 described species in Anotylus.

Species
These 95 species belong to the genus Anotylus:

 Anotylus affinis (Czwalina, 1871)
 Anotylus alpicola (Casey, 1894)
 Anotylus antennarius Bernhauer, 1907
 Anotylus arellanoae Makranczy, 2011
 Anotylus athenensis (R.Dvorak, 1954)
 Anotylus benisculptilis Wang, Zhou & Lü, 2017
 Anotylus bernhaueri (Ganglbauer, 1898)
 Anotylus breviceps (Casey, 1894)
 Anotylus brevipennis (Fauvel, 1872)
 Anotylus brevisculptilis Wang, Zhou & Lü, 2017
 Anotylus caffer (Erichson, 1840)
 Anotylus chinkiangensis Bernhauer, 1938
 Anotylus clavatus (Strand, 1946)
 Anotylus clypeonitens (Pandellé, 1867)
 Anotylus cognatus Sharp, 1874
 Anotylus complanatus (Erichson, 1839)
 Anotylus coonoor Makranczy, 2017
 Anotylus corcyranus Coiffait, 1968
 Anotylus debae Makranczy, 2011
 Anotylus deboeri Makranczy, 2011
 Anotylus densus (Casey, 1894)
 Anotylus engeli Makranczy, 2011
 Anotylus exasperatus (Kraatz, 1859)
 Anotylus exiguus (Erichson, 1840)
 Anotylus extrasculptilis Wang, Zhou & Lü, 2017
 Anotylus fairmairei (Pandellé, 1867)
 Anotylus fraternus (Cameron)
 Anotylus ganapati Makranczy, 2017
 Anotylus glareosus (Wollaston, 1854)
 Anotylus gunung Makranczy, 2017
 Anotylus hamatus (Fairmaire & Laboulbène, 1856)
 Anotylus hamuliger (Fauvel, 1905)
 Anotylus hartmanni Makranczy, 2017
 Anotylus herculis (Bernhauer, 1936)
 Anotylus hybridus (Eppelsheim, 1878)
 Anotylus ijen Makranczy, 2017
 Anotylus incilis (Sharp, 1887)
 Anotylus insecatus (Gravenhorst, 1806)
 Anotylus insignitus (Gravenhorst, 1806)
 Anotylus intricatus (Erichson, 1840)
 Anotylus inustus (Gravenhorst, 1806)
 Anotylus jambi Makranczy, 2017
 Anotylus kabasi Makranczy, 2017
 Anotylus latiusculus (Kraatz, 1859)
 Anotylus linaxi Makranczy, 2017
 Anotylus luridipennis (Luze, 1904)
 Anotylus maritimus Thomson, 1861
 Anotylus mendus Herman, 1970
 Anotylus mimulus (Sharp, 1874)
 Anotylus munitus (Casey, 1894)
 Anotylus mutator (Lohse, 1963)
 Anotylus nanus (Erichson, 1840)
 Anotylus neotomae (Hatch, 1957)
 Anotylus nigelisculptilis Wang, Zhou & Lü, 2017
 Anotylus niger (LeConte, 1877)
 Anotylus nitelisculptilis Wang, Zhou & Lü, 2017
 Anotylus nitidifrons (Wollaston, 1871)
 Anotylus nitidulus (Gravenhorst, 1802)
 Anotylus obscurellus (Fauvel, 1905)
 Anotylus opaciceps Bernhauer, 1938
 Anotylus petzi (Bernhauer, 1914)
 Anotylus placusinus (LeConte, 1877)
 Anotylus plagiatus (Rosenhauer, 1856)
 Anotylus politus (Erichson, 1840)
 Anotylus pumilus (Erichson, 1839)
 Anotylus rectisculptilis Wang, Zhou & Lü, 2017
 Anotylus riedeli Makranczy, 2017
 Anotylus rugifrons (Hochhuth, 1849)
 Anotylus rugosus (Fabricius, 1775)
 Anotylus rurukan Makranczy, 2017
 Anotylus saulcyi (Pandellé, 1867)
 Anotylus schatzmayri (Koch, 1937)
 Anotylus schawalleri Makranczy, 2017
 Anotylus schillhammeri Makranczy, 2017
 Anotylus schuelkei Makranczy, 2017
 Anotylus sculpturatus (Gravenhorst, 1806)
 Anotylus sikkimi Fauvel, 1905
 Anotylus sobrinus (LeConte, 1877)
 Anotylus spec Makranczy, 2017
 Anotylus speculifrons (Kraatz, 1857)
 Anotylus steineri Makranczy, 2013
 Anotylus subanophthalmicus Outerelo, Gamara & Salgado, 1998
 Anotylus subsericeus Bernhauer, 1938
 Anotylus suspectus (Casey, 1894)
 Anotylus tanator Makranczy, 2017
 Anotylus tetracarinatus (Block, 1799)
 Anotylus tetratoma (Czwalina, 1871)
 Anotylus topali Makranczy, 2017
 Anotylus torretassoi (Koch, 1932)
 Anotylus varisculptilis Wang, Zhou & Lü, 2017
 Anotylus vegrandis (Casey, 1894)
 Anotylus vicinus Sharp, 1874
 Anotylus vinsoni (Cameron, 1936)
 Anotylus zavadili (Roubal, 1941)
 † Oxytelus gibbulus (Eppelsheim, 1877)

References

Further reading

External links

 

Oxytelinae
Articles created by Qbugbot